Franco Ariel Sosa Portela (born on 12 August 1983 in Tacuarembó) is a Uruguayan footballer.

External links
 Player profile 

1983 births
Living people
People from Tacuarembó Department
Uruguayan footballers
Uruguayan expatriate footballers
Association football midfielders
Tacuarembó F.C. players
C.D. Marathón players
FBC Melgar footballers
Xelajú MC players
Cerro Largo F.C. players
Deportivo La Guaira players
Deportivo Mictlán players
Liga Nacional de Fútbol Profesional de Honduras players
Peruvian Primera División players
Uruguayan Primera División players
Uruguayan Segunda División players
Venezuelan Primera División players
Uruguayan expatriate sportspeople in Honduras
Uruguayan expatriate sportspeople in Peru
Uruguayan expatriate sportspeople in Guatemala
Uruguayan expatriate sportspeople in Venezuela
Expatriate footballers in Honduras
Expatriate footballers in Peru
Expatriate footballers in Guatemala
Expatriate footballers in Venezuela